Maoping is a town under the administration of Baihe County, Shaanxi, China. , it has one residential community and 15 villages under its administration.

References 

Township-level divisions of Shaanxi
Baihe County